Miffy (pronounced ) is a fictional rabbit appearing in a series of picture books drawn and written by Dutch artist Dick Bruna. The original Dutch name, "Nijntje", is a shortening of the diminutive konijntje, "little rabbit".

The first Miffy book was produced in 1955 and almost thirty others have followed. In total they have sold over 100 million copies. In addition, two separate television series as well as items such as clothes and toys featuring the character followed. On 30 January 2013, a feature-length film, Miffy the Movie, was released in theaters and stars Eva Poppink in the title role.

Four television series based on the character have been produced: Dick Bruna's Miffy Storybook Classics from 1984; Miffy: Colors, Numbers, and Shapes from 1996; Miffy and Friends from 2003; and Miffy's Adventures Big and Small from 2015.

History
Miffy was created in 1955 after Bruna had been telling his one-year-old son, Sierk, stories about a little rabbit they had seen earlier in the dunes, while on holiday at Egmond aan Zee. Miffy became a female after Bruna decided that he wanted to draw a dress and not trousers on his rabbit. Depending on the story, Miffy can range in age from being a baby to being four years old.

At first Miffy looked like a toy animal with floppy ears, but by 1963, her design was changed to her current incarnation, a stylized form of a rabbit. Miffy is drawn in a graphic style, with minimalist black graphic lines.  Bruna chose to only use black, white, the primary colours (red, yellow, and blue), green, orange, brown, and grey. It is his use of primarily primary colors that makes Miffy instantly recognisable, and also popular with preschoolers, because of her bright and intense simplistic colours.

Almost 32 Miffy titles have been published and many more for the other characters. Bruna has produced a total of 124 picture books for children. The Miffy books each contain twelve pages of story. Each page has one illustration and four lines of verse, the last word of the second line rhymes with the last of the fourth. They are written about things that children can understand, and situations they will face such as going to the hospital and going to school, and they always have a happy ending. Some books have no text at all, such as Miffy's Dream.

The books are printed in small format. Bruna considers it important that his audience feels that his books are there for them, not for their parents. Most Miffy books have an advisory reading level of age four to eight years.

Bruna's books have been translated into more than 50 different languages, and over 85 million copies have been sold all over the world. It is also translated in dialects, including in Zeelandic by Engel Reinhoudt. Dick Bruna has won many awards for his books, such as the Golden Brush in 1990, for Boris Bear and the Silver Brush for Miffy In The Tent in 1996. In 1997, he was awarded the Silver Slate for Dear Grandma Bunny, a book where Miffy's grandmother was sick and died.

The other characters that appear in the books are her family: Miffy's parents, her Grandma and Grandpa, her Auntie Alice, and 'Uncle Bob,' a family friend, who appears in Miffy Goes Flying. A new brother or sister for Miffy is introduced in Miffy And The New Baby. She also has many friends, Boris and Barbara Bear, who first appeared in 1989 and are boyfriend and girlfriend, Poppy Pig, who appeared in 1977, and her niece Grunty, Snuffy, who appeared in 1969, and other bunnies such as Aggie and Melanie.

In the early 1990s, an image of Miffy holding an adjustable spanner coyly behind her back appeared on flyers produced by people taking direct action against the UK government's road building program. This unauthorised use of the character spread and Miffy became a mascot for groups involved in radical ecological direct action.

Miffy appeared in her first TV show in 1984, called Dick Bruna's Miffy Storybook Classics: The Original Series. Directed by veteran animator Gene Deitch, each episode was traditionally animated and ran for approximately five minutes. The show aired in the Netherlands on KRO, in the United Kingdom on ITV, in Canada on TVOntario in Australia on ABC, and in the USA on Cartoon Network's Small World block with VHS releases from Geneon USA, episodes of the show were later included as Bonus Features on Miffy and Friends DVDs.

From 2003 to 2007, Miffy and Friends aired on children's television channels such as Treehouse in Canada, and Noggin in the USA. The show added several new characters, such as Melanie's African family and the family of Boris' and Barbara's common cousin, Umik. The series was produced by Pedri Animation BV, a Dutch stop-motion animation company. It was voiced simply by a feminine storytelling narrator.

Miffy is sometimes assumed to be a Japanese character, because Sanrio's Hello Kitty, introduced in 1974, is rendered using a similar line style. The Miffy brand is popular in Japan, with strong sales of Japanese-made Miffy merchandise. In an interview for The Daily Telegraph, Bruna expressed his dislike for Hello Kitty. "'That,' he says darkly, 'is a copy [of Miffy], I think. I don't like that at all. I always think, "No, don't do that. Try to make something that you think of yourself". In 1999, Miffy was the ninth top-selling character in Japan, where licensed merchandise sold .

In addition, on 26 August 2010, Mercis BV, representing Bruna, brought suit against Sanrio with the claim that one of Hello Kitty's companion characters, a rabbit named Cathy, infringes on the copyright and trademark of Miffy. On 2 November 2010, a Dutch court ruled against Sanrio and ordered the company to stop marketing Cathy products in Belgium, Luxembourg, and the Netherlands. On 7 June 2011, following the Tōhoku earthquake and tsunami in Japan, Sanrio and Mercis reached an out-of-court settlement requiring Sanrio to halt production of merchandise that features Cathy. Instead of continuing the court battle, the two companies announced that they would donate the legal fees to help the earthquake victims.

In Bruna's hometown, Utrecht, there is a square named after nijntje, the Nijntjepleintje (lit: Little Nijntje Square, to retain the rhyme) and in 2006, the Centraal Museum opened a permanent exhibition, the dick bruna huis (Dick Bruna house).

Miffy celebrated her fiftieth birthday in 2005. This was marked in cities across the globe, for example, at the Manchester Art Gallery in England. She also serves a "celebrity character spokesperson" for Unicef.

Miffy's namesakes include a new species of booklouse from Peru. The insect was given the scientific name Trichadenotecnum miffy in 2008, because its epiproct, an appendage on its abdomen, resembles a small rabbit.

In July 2014, Bruna announced his retirement; the rights to the Miffy character are not sold.

Miffy's Adventures Big and Small premiered 2 October 2015. It currently has a total of six seasons. It airs on the Nick Jr. Channel in the USA.

On 16 February 2017, Dick Bruna died at the age of 89.

Characters
 Miffy: Miffy is a little girl rabbit. She likes to draw. She also likes to play with her friends.
 Miffy's school friends: Miffy and her school friends have been friends for a very long time.
 Dan: A new boy in Miffy's class. He sits next to Miffy at school. He has floppy ears.
 Uncle Pilot: Miffy's uncle is Father Bunny's brother. He has his own airplane.
 Father and Mother Bunny: Father and Mother Bunny live in a little white house with a red roof. They often take Miffy to the zoo, the playground, or the museum.
 Grandpa and Grandma Bunny: Grandpa and Grandma Bunny are Father Bunny's parents. They often go and visit Miffy.
 Auntie Alice: Auntie Alice is Father Bunny's sister.
 The New Baby: The new baby is still a tiny baby.
 Melanie: Melanie is Miffy's pen friend.
 Snuffy: Snuffy is a female dog. She has three puppies.
 Boris Bear: Boris Bear lives in the little wooden house near the woods with his girlfriend, Barbara Bear. 
 Barbara Bear: Barbara Bear is Boris Bear's girlfriend.
 Poppy Pig: Poppy Pig lives in a lovely little house with little plants beneath the windows.
 Grunty: Grunty is Poppy Pig's niece.
 Farmer John: He is a human character in this series. He sows seeds and writes about Industrial Society and its Future.

Miffy storybooks
From Dick Bruna, Linders J, Sierman K, de Wijs I and Vrooland-Löb T. Wanders Publishers, Zwolle, 2006. (English)  (Dutch) 

 1955 Miffy, Miffy at the Zoo (first version of Miffy)
 1963 Miffy, Miffy at the Zoo, Miffy in the Snow, Miffy at the Seaside
 1969 Snuffy, Snuffy and the Fire
 1970 Miffy Goes Flying, Miffy's Birthday
 1975 Miffy at the Playground, Miffy in Hospital
 1977 Poppy Pig, Poppy Pig's Garden
 1979 Miffy's Dream
 1980 Poppy Pig Goes to Market
 1982 Farmer John, Miffy's Bicycle
 1984 Miffy at School
 1986 Through the year with Boris Bear, Poppy Pig's Birthday, Snuffy's Puppies
 1988 Miffy Goes to Visit, Grandpa and Grandma Bunny/Grandpa and Grandma Rabbit
 1989 Boris Bear, Boris and Barbara, Boris on the hill/Boris on the mountain
 1990 Lottie, Miffy is Crying/Why Miffy Cried, Miffy's House 1992 Auntie Alice's Party/The Party of auntie Alice 1994 Boris in the Snow, Boris, Barbara and benny, Poppy Pig is sick 1995 Miffy in the Tent 
 1997 Lieve Oma Pluis (Dutch) 
 1996 Miffy at the Gallery 1997 Miffy and Melanie 1999 Miffy the Ghost, Miffy the Fairy 2001 Miffy Dances 2002 Miffy's Letter, The New Baby 2003 Miffy's Garden 2004 Miffy in Lolly Land, A Flute for Miffy 2005 Hangoor (Flopear); in Dutch only
 2006 Queen Miffy 
 2008 Nijntje en de seizoenen (Miffy and the Seasons), Nijntje is Stout (Miffy is Naughty); in Dutch only
 2009 Een cadeau voor Opa Pluis (A Gift for Grandpa Bunny); in Dutch only
 2014 Miffy on Holiday 2015 Miffy and the Royal Baby; A Lift-the-Flap Book
 2017 Miffy is Naughty 2018 "Dear Grandma Bunny" (English version of "Lieve Oma Pluis")

Published by Big Tent Entertainment
 2005 Miffy Loves New York CityPublished by The Tate Gallery, London
 2007 Miffy the ArtistPublished by Mercis Publishing bv Amsterdam & Rijksmuseum Amsterdam
 2019 Miffy x RembrandtInternational broadcast
 United States: Cartoon Network (1996), Noggin
 The Netherlands: KRO
 Germany: Super RTL (1995-2013) as part of Toggolino
 United Kingdom: Tiny Pop, ITV
 Australia: ABC
 Japan: NHK
 Korean: EBS, Tooniverse

See also

 Musti

References

External links

 Official Miffy website (English)
 Official Nijntje website (Dutch)
 "I saw Matisse - and came up with Miffy", article by The Telegraph "The little rabbit with a big audience", article by The Telegraph''

1953 children's books
Dutch children's books
Dutch picture books
Series of children's books
Female characters in literature
Child characters in literature
Anthropomorphic animal characters
Dutch novels adapted into films
Dutch novels adapted into television shows
Dutch novels adapted into plays
Books about rabbits and hares
Literary characters introduced in 1955
1980s British children's television series
1990s British children's television series
1980s British animated television series
1990s British animated television series
1980s Dutch television series
1990s Dutch television series
1984 British television series debuts
1996 British television series endings
1984 Dutch television series debuts
1996 Dutch television series endings
British television shows based on children's books
English-language television shows
Dutch-language television shows
Television shows based on Dutch novels
Nickelodeon original programming
Nick Jr. original programming
PBS Kids shows
Treehouse TV original programming
Animated television series about rabbits and hares
Animated television series about children
Fictional Dutch people